Olga Vladimirovna Nazarova, born 1 June 1965) is a Russian former track and field athlete who competed mainly in the 400 metres. She represented the Soviet Union. She won two Olympic gold medals in the 4 × 400 metres relay, in 1988 and 1992. Her 1988 split time of 47.8, remains one of the fastest relay splits of all-time. She also won World Championship gold (1991) and silver (1987) in the relay, and a 1988 Olympic bronze medal in the 400 metres.

Career
Nazarova competed for the Soviet Union at the 1987 World Championships in Rome, finishing eighth in the 400 metres final and winning a silver medal in the 4 x 400m relay, with 400m gold medallist Olga Bryzgina, Aelita Yurchenko and Mariya Pinigina. She went on to compete for the Soviet Union at the 1988 Summer Olympics held in Seoul, winning the bronze medal in the 400 metres. She then joined with gold medalist Olga Bryzgina, 400m hurdles silver medalist Tatyana Ledovskaya and Mariya Pinigina to win gold in the 4 × 400 m relay. That USSR relay team set a new world record of 3:15.17 minutes which is still unbeaten.

Nazarova competed only in the relay at the 1991 World Championships, winning a gold medal, along with Bryzgina, Ledovskaya and Lyudmila Dzhigalova. She competed for the Commonwealth of Independent States at the 1992 Summer Olympics held in Barcelona, finishing fourth in the 400m final. In the 4 x 400 metres, she won the gold medal, along with Bryzgina (who had this time won the silver medal in the 400m), Dzhigalova and Yelena Ruzina.

International competitions

Note: The Soviet Union originally finished 2nd in the 4 × 400 m at the 1986 European Championships, before being disqualified for a lane infringement.

See also
List of Olympic medalists in athletics (women)
List of 1988 Summer Olympics medal winners
List of 1992 Summer Olympics medal winners
List of World Athletics Championships medalists (women)
List of Russian sportspeople
400 metres at the Olympics
4 × 400 metres relay at the Olympics

References

1965 births
Living people
Soviet female sprinters
Olympic female sprinters
Olympic athletes of the Soviet Union
Olympic athletes of the Unified Team
Olympic gold medalists for the Soviet Union
Olympic bronze medalists for the Soviet Union
Olympic gold medalists for the Unified Team
Olympic gold medalists in athletics (track and field)
Olympic bronze medalists in athletics (track and field)
Athletes (track and field) at the 1988 Summer Olympics
Athletes (track and field) at the 1992 Summer Olympics
Medalists at the 1988 Summer Olympics
Medalists at the 1992 Summer Olympics
World Athletics Championships athletes for the Soviet Union
World Athletics Championships athletes for Russia
World Athletics Championships medalists
World Athletics Championships winners
CIS Athletics Championships winners
World Athletics record holders (relay)